is a Japanese football player who plays for Omiya Ardija.

Club career
Minami was born in Kawasaki on 30 September 1979. After graduating from Shizuoka Gakuen High School, he joined J1 League club Kashiwa Reysol in 1998. He played as regular goalkeeper instead Yoichi Doi from summer in first season. He battles with Minami for the position with Motohiro Yoshida from 1999 and Reysol won the 3rd place in 1999 and 2000 J1 League. Minami completely became a regular goalkeeper from 2001. However the club results were sluggish from 2002 and was relegated to J2 League end of 2005 season. In 2006 season, Reysol won the 2nd place and returned to J1 from 2007. Although he played as regular goalkeeper from 2007, his opportunity to play decreased behind new player Takanori Sugeno from 2008. In 2009, he could not play at all in the match in J1 League and Reysol was relegated to J2 again.

In 2010, Minami moved to J2 club Roasso Kumamoto. He played as regular goalkeeper for 4 seasons until 2013 season. In 2014, he moved to J2 club Yokohama FC.

National team career
In June 1997, when Minami was a Shizuoka Gakuen High School student, he was selected Japan U-20 national team for 1997 World Youth Championship and he played 4 matches. In April 1999, he was selected U-20 Japan for 1999 World Youth Championship second time. At this tournament, he played full time in all 7 matches and Japan won the 2nd place.

Mistake
Minami became one of the few goalkeepers in football history managing to score an own goal against Sanfrecce Hiroshima in a J. League match on 22 May 2004. He had gathered the ball and originally planned to throw the ball at first, but he paused and lost control, hurling the ball back into the net to the disbelief of his Kashiwa teammates. The goal wouldn't matter, as Kashiwa lost 3-0.

Club statistics

Honors and awards
 FIFA World Youth Championship runner-up: 1999

References

External links

1979 births
Living people
Association football people from Kanagawa Prefecture
Japanese footballers
Japan youth international footballers
J1 League players
J2 League players
Kashiwa Reysol players
Roasso Kumamoto players
Yokohama FC players
Omiya Ardija players
Footballers at the 1998 Asian Games
Association football goalkeepers
Asian Games competitors for Japan